Notre Dame College is a Catholic secondary school in Ma Tau Wai, Hong Kong. It serves years secondary 1-6 and was established in 1967.

References

External links
 Notre Dame College  

Catholic secondary schools in Hong Kong
Ma Tau Wai
1967 establishments in Hong Kong
Educational institutions established in 1967